Portsmouth Arms railway station is a small wayside station in Devon. It is in the parish of Burrington but remote from any village so is named after the nearby 'Portsmouth Arms' pub.

History
The 4th Earl of Portsmouth built the turnpike between Exeter and Barnstaple and was later a supporter of proposals for a railway along the same route. A pub was built in the Taw valley and named in his honour. It was at this spot that the North Devon Railway opened a station in September 1855, more than a year after it started running trains through the site. It had a small passing loop and a single long siding at the south end for goods traffic. The passenger facilities were in a building on the northbound platform while the southbound platform had a waiting shelter and a goods store. A house for the station master was added later and a signal box was opened on 1 October 1873.

The goods yard was closed on 3 July 1961 and the siding removed in 1963. The signal box remained in use until 3 April 1966. In 2006 Formosa, a Pullman car built in 1921, was placed behind the platform to be restored.

Description
The station has a single platform on the west side of the line, adjacent to the A377 road. The old station house is now in private use but there is a waiting shelter on the platform. There is a bike rack but no car parking.

Services
All services at Portsmouth Arms are operated by Great Western Railway.

Community railway
The railway between Exeter and Barnstaple is designated as a community railway and is supported by marketing provided by the Devon and Cornwall Rail Partnership. The line is promoted as the Tarka Line.

References

Railway stations in Devon
Railway stations in Great Britain opened in 1855
Former London and South Western Railway stations
Railway stations served by Great Western Railway
Railway request stops in Great Britain
DfT Category F2 stations